Bosnia and Herzegovina competed at the 2016 Winter Youth Olympics in Lillehammer, Norway from 12 to 21 February 2016.

Alpine skiing

Girls

Biathlon

Boys

Girls

Cross-country skiing

Boys

Girls

See also
Bosnia and Herzegovina at the 2016 Summer Olympics

References

2016 in Bosnia and Herzegovina sport
Nations at the 2016 Winter Youth Olympics
Bosnia and Herzegovina at the Youth Olympics